Nellimukal is a small village located in Kerala, India. This village is part of Adoor Thaluk and comes under Pathanamthitta district. Its nearest town is Adoor which is about 5 km away.

Etymology
The word nelli in Malayalam is a vernacular name for "Phyllanthus emblica". The name Nellimukal comes from nelli, because  before they were replaced by rubber plantations. Really the name of this place was "Puliyanaththara" because there were tigers in this place[not exist now].

Geography
This village has beautiful farmlands. The plants and trees grown in farms are rubber, coconut, banana, tapioca, Amorphophallus paeoniifolius, etc.  A state highway connecting Adoor to Chavara passes through the village. This village is partially hilly and had quarries, which is now ceased. Pallickal river flows through this village.

Education
Govt.LPS Nellimukal is the main educational institution in this village.

References

Villages in Pathanamthitta district